The Singing House (German: Das singende Haus) is a 1948 Austrian comedy film directed by Franz Antel and starring Richard Romanowsky, Hannelore Schroth and Hans Moser. It was first shown at the Locarno Film Festival in July 1947, before going on general release in Austria in early 1948.

The film's sets were designed by the art director Julius von Borsody. It was shot at the Rosenhügel Studios in Vienna, which was controlled by the Soviet occupation forces. It was distributed by the East Berlin-based Sovexport.

Cast
 Richard Romanowsky as Professor Cattori 
 Hannelore Schroth as Melanie, seine Tochter 
 Hans Moser as Franz Huber, Greißler 
 Herta Mayen as Gretl, seine Tochter 
 Walter Müller as Freddy 
 Curd Jürgens as Bandleader Hans Storch 
 Paul Kemp as Karli Weidner 
 Teddy Kern as Stepanek 
 Peter Wehle as Peter 
 Karl Skraup as Attila Meisel 
 Theodor Danegger as Direktor Hofer 
 Susi Nicoletti as Fritzi, seine Sekretärin 
 Dorothea Neff as Frl. Streusand 
 Hans Wolff as Rotter, Manager

References

Bibliography 
 Fritsche, Maria. Homemade Men in Postwar Austrian Cinema: Nationhood, Genre and Masculinity. Berghahn Books, 2013.
 Von Dassanowsky, Robert. Austrian Cinema: A History. McFarland, 2005.

External links 
 

1948 films
Austrian comedy films
1948 comedy films
1940s German-language films
Films directed by Franz Antel
Austrian black-and-white films
Films shot at Rosenhügel Studios